Rose Marie "Jane" Ingham (15 August 189710 September 1982) was an English botanist and scientific translator. She was appointed research assistant to Joseph Hubert Priestley in the Botany Department at the University of Leeds, and together, they were the first to separate cell walls from the root tip of broad beans. They analysed these cell walls and concluded that they contained protein. She carried out experiments on the cork layer of trees to study how cells function under a change of orientation and found profound differences in cell division and elongation in the epidermal layer of plants.

At Leeds, Ingham was appointed subwarden of Weetwood Hall, and honorary secretary of the BritishItalian League. In 1930, she joined the Imperial Bureau of Plant and Crop Genetics at the School of Agriculture in Cambridge, England, as a scientific officer and translator. The bureau was responsible for publishing a series of abstract journals on various aspects of crop breeding and genetics. In 1932, she married Albert Ingham, then a fellow and director of studies at King's College, Cambridge. Ingham spent the war years in Princeton, New Jersey, with her two sons, not wishing to return to England after travelling to the US just before the outbreak of World War II. In the last years of her life, she and her husband travelled extensively, and in 1982, she died at Cambridge.

Early life
She was the youngest daughter of Helen Mary TupperCarey, and Albert Darell. They had married at Donhead StAndrew on 16May 1890. Helen Mary was the daughter of Reverend Horace Edward Chapman, a former rector of Donhead StAndrew, and Adelaide Maria, néeFletcher.

Ingham's father was the son of the Reverend Tupper Carey and Helen Jane, néeSandeman. He was educated at Eton and Christ Church, Oxford, and trained at Cuddesdon Theological College. He was curate of Leeds before being appointed rector of St Margaret's Church, Lowestoft. In 1910, he was appointed canon residentiary of York, and later, became vicar of Huddersfield. From 1938, he was Chaplain to the King and at Monte Carlo. Despite his given name being Albert Darell, he was known as "Tupper" to his friends and was described by John Gilbert Lockhart in Cosmo Gordon Lang's biography as follows:

Ingham had four siblings. Her eldest sister, Jacqueline Marjorie, married the Reverend Edgar James Mitchell, and after their marriage, they undertook missionary work in the Far East. Ingham's elder sister, Edith, known as "Betty" to her friends and family, married the author Michael Sadleir. Sadleir was the only son of Sir Michael Ernest Sadler, a former vice-chancellor of the University of Leeds. Her elder brother, Humphrey Darell , was a tea planter in British East Africa before the outbreak of World War I. He was commissioned a lieutenant in the King's African Rifles, but was severely wounded in the right thigh during the East African campaign. He married Marjorie Gertrude Drakes, née Bredin, the widow of Charles Henry Drakes. In later life, he worked for the Colonial Service in Nigeria and was appointed a Companion of the Imperial Service Order in the Queen's 1959 Birthday Honours. Her younger brother, Peter Charles Sandeman, was a captain in the Royal Navy. He married Anne Ethel Violet Montagu Dundas, the eldest daughter of Robert Neville Dundas and Cecil Mary, née Lancaster.

Education

Ingham was educated at Claire House School, an all girl school in North Parade, Lowestoft, which specialised in the teaching of French. At the age of ten, she gained a prize in preliminary French examinations that were organised by the National Society of French Professors in England. She competed against candidates from the "best girls' schools in England", the written tests consisting of translation and composition (prose and poetry), essay, and questions on 17th to 19thcentury French literature. In the same year, she performed as Philaminte in the school's production of three scenes from Molière's Les Femmes Savantes.

Ingham showed an early interest in botany. In her youth, she would collect wildflowers to display at local parish shows. Her grandmother, Helen Jane Carey, was a keen amateur botanist and specimen collector, a popular and fashionable pastime in Victorian England. In 1916, Ingham entered the University of Leeds to study botany and, within three years, was a research student in the botany department at Leeds, studying water absorption at the growing point of plant roots. In 1919, Ingham studied general zoology at the Citadel Hill Laboratory of the Marine Biological Association, Plymouth. Annie Redman King, her friend from Weetwood Hall in Leeds, was a Ray Lankester investigator at the laboratory.

Career

In January 1922, Ingham was appointed a research assistant in the botany department, where Joseph Hubert Priestley was Dean of the Faculty of Science. She and Priestley were the first to isolate cell walls from meristematic tissues in Vicia faba (broad beans). They analysed the walls for protein, cellulose, and pectin, and concluded that the walls contained protein. They also studied when cellulose is first produced by plants, the differences in shoot and root development, and the role of the cork cambium. These plant physiology studies were followed by two New Phytologist papers. She later provided unpublished results from these experiments on broad bean embryos to the British botanist William Pearsall. Described as a "brilliant scholar", she was awarded a MSc degree on 28June 1928, for her research work and thesis titled .

In February 1930, Ingham joined the Imperial Bureau of Plant and Crop Genetics, at the Plant Breeding Institute, Cambridge, as a translator and scientific officer. Sir Rowland Biffen was the first director of the Cambridge bureau, and her supervisor, Penrhyn Stanley Hudson , was deputy director. She was fluent in French, Italian, German and Swedish, and as a whole, the bureau had been capable of dealing with Spanish, Dutch, and Russian. Abstracts were written on various aspects of plant breeding and genetics, with some of the foreign language papers requiring more complete translations. These abstracts were published in a quarterly journal called Plant Breeding Abstracts. In 1931, she attended the eighth conference of the Association of Special Libraries and Information Bureaux (ASLIB) at Oxford, where progress on ASLIB's newlyformed panel of expert translators was discussed. After her marriage, she worked from home translating most of the German documents, and in 1939, was put in charge of the bureau after Hudson fell ill.

Personal life
Around 1922, Ingham sat for a portrait by William Roberts, the "English Cubist" artist. The finished painting was titled "Portrait of Miss Jane TupperCarey" and was shown for the first time in November 1923 at New Chenil Galleries, Chelsea. By 1926, she had been appointed subwarden at Weetwood Hall, the then university hall of residence for women students. In the same year, she was appointed the first honorary secretary of the Leeds branch of the BritishItalian League. The League's aims were to found a chair in Italian at the University of Leeds and foster relations between the two countries.

In the late 1920s, Ingham joined the Leeds University Amateurs, the university's amateur dramatics society, acting in several wellreceived roles, such as Sybil Bumont in The Watched Pot. In December 1928, she took part in a fashion show of dresses through the ages at the Albion Hall, Leeds, in aid of StFaith's Homes. She wore a high-waisted, skintight coat of red cloth edged with fur, a long blue skirt trimmed with six rows of black velvet, and a feather toque. Her appearance was greeted with "shrieks of laughter" from the audience.

She married Albert Ingham on 6July 1932 at St Edward's Church, Cambridge, in a private ceremony attended only by her parents, sister Edith, brotherinlaw Michael Sadleir, who gave her away, and Redman King. They had met after he had been appointed reader in mathematical analysis at the University of Leeds in 1926. Their engagement announcement in May 1932 had come as surprise to their circle of friends in Leeds, as there had been no indication that they were romantically involved. However, they had been quietly engaged with plans to announce it after lectures ended.

In July 1939, Albert was awarded a Leverhulme Research Fellowship to study analytic number theory at the Institute for Advanced Study (IAS) in Princeton, New Jersey. At that point, they had two sons, Michael Frank and Stephen Darell, and the entire family sailed from Liverpool to New York on 1September 1939. However, just two days into their voyage, Britain declared war on Germany. They were hesitant to bring their family back due to reports from Europe containing speculation of imminent total war. Consequently, they made the decision to keep the family in Princeton, except for Albert, who had returned to England by 1942. Alan Pars, godfather to their son Michael, later recommended Albert for an Admiralty post in America knowing that Ingham and the children were still there.

Later life and death

The Inghams owned a punt, called Pete, moored in the River Cam, and it was used regularly during the summer for trips and picnics. They also went on many trips abroad, including India, and walking holidays in the French Alps. It was on such a holiday that Albert died of a heart attack on a high path near Haute-Savoie, southeastern France. After his death, she resisted offers for her husband's mathematical notes and papers, instead keeping the papers in a cupboard at the house.

Jane Ingham died at Cambridge on 10September 1982, and was cremated at the Cambridge City Crematorium, Huntingdon Road, Dry Drayton, on 20September 1982. Alan Pars, her friend and her husband's former colleague at Cambridge, sent a wreath.

Legacy

Discovery of protein in plant cell walls
Ingham and Priestley were the first to isolate cell walls from the middle lamella of the radicle and plumule meristems of Vicia faba. They analysed the cell walls for protein, cellulose, and pectin. They showed that the cellulose in the wall of the radicle is masked by other substances, particularly proteins and fatty acids. In the plumule, cellulose is associated with greater quantities of pectin, but less protein and fatty acid, particularly when the adult parenchyma is grown in light.

They concluded that the meristematic cells had walls containing a proteinpectin complex, that is, these walls "...commencing as interfaces in a proteincontaining medium may be regarded as composed at first mainly of protein." Florence Mary Wood, a British postdoctoral researcher in biochemistry at Birkbeck College, questioned their results and concluded that less than 0.001% of protein was found in the cell walls of the plants examined. Later researchers found protein in the cells but were unable to rule out the possibility of cytoplasmic contamination. It is now known that the middle lamella consists of a pectic polysaccharide-rich material. However, the material properties and molecular organisation of the middle lamella are still not fully understood.

Differences in cell division and elongation in the epidermal layer of plants
Ingham found that in the arch of the hypocotyl from sunflower seeds, Helianthus annuus, there are considerably more cells on the outside than on the inside. Counting from the beginning to the end of the arch, the result was "3,299 cells on the upper side as against 1,531 on the lower." This result means that the convex side of the arch leads the concave side, not only in terms of cell extension, but also in cell division behaviour, such that a different division rate would cause the growth difference. Consequently, the concave and convex sides show profound physiological differences. The observation that in the hypocotyl the cells on the convex side are considerably larger than those on the inside could be explained by the uneven transverse transport of the growth hormone auxin. Auxin has a strengthening effect on the elongation growth of the cells. In the case of nutation phenomena, it is possible that curvature only occurs in a narrowly limited section of the shoot.

Harald Kaldewey, professor of botany at Saarland University in Saarbrücken, Germany, measured the differences in the length of the subepidermal cells on the outer and inner periphery of the arch in the nutation curvature of the pedicels of snake's head fritillary, Fritillaria meleagris. The result was expected if the curvature is based exclusively on differences in elongation growth. A difference in width between the sub-epidermal cells of the outer and inner periphery of the arch of curvature was not found. Sir Edward James Salisbury, the English botanist and ecologist, found good agreement between the ratio of the epidermal cell lengths and the arch lengths of the nutation curvature of the epicotyl in seedlings of different woody plants. The findings of Ingham, Salisbury, and Kaldewey, do not necessarily contradict each other as the epidermis and sub-epidermal layer may well behave differently than cortical layers in terms of division and extension growth.

Importance of cell orientation in cork

In Ingham's last study in the botany department at the University of Leeds, she ringbarked Laburnum and sycamore (Acer pseudoplatanus) trees, but left zigzag bridges of tissue with horizontal portions linking the bark above and below the cut. At first, the lack of pressure within these bridges resulted in the formation of calluslike tissue, and the cambial initials, by repeated division, came to resemble ray cells. Xylem and phloem formed in the horizontal portion of the bridge with its tracheary elements extended in a horizontal direction. It has been postulated that calluses are formed because the cambium cells cannot function correctly under a change of orientation. For example, the altered direction of sap flow might affect the direction of cambial cell growth. Pressure, nutrient movements, and cambial  auxin transport have also been suggested as causes.

Publications

As author
 
  Refereed by William Lawrence Balls in May 1923.

As experimental collaborator

See also

Footnotes

References

Further reading
 
 
  Archbishop Cosmo Lang's biography of Ingham's father.

External links
 Portrait of Ingham by William Roberts, circa 1922, "An English Cubist".
 Afterimages: Photographs as an External Autobiographical Memory System and a Contemporary Art Practice, University of the Arts London Research Online. Photographs of Jane Ingham, taken by Albert Ingham, for Mark Ingham's PhD thesis at Goldsmiths, University of London.
 Works by Ingham at WorldCat.
 Lorna Scott and her Mortar Board by Margaret Stewart, for Egham Museum, on botanist Lorna Iris Scott, Joseph Hubert Priestley's collaborator after Ingham left for Cambridge.

1897 births
1982 deaths
20th-century British botanists
20th-century British women scientists
20th-century English people
20th-century English women
Academics of the University of Leeds
Alumni of the University of Leeds
British translators
British women botanists
English botanists
German–English translators
People from Cambridge
People from Leeds
Women botanists